A list of films produced in the United Kingdom in 1944:

1944

See also
 1944 in British music
 1944 in British television
 1944 in the United Kingdom

External links
 

1944
Films
British
1940s in British cinema